Roeperocharis is a genus of flowering plants from the orchid family, Orchidaceae, native to eastern Africa. As of June 2014, the following species are recognized:

Roeperocharis alcicornis Kraenzl. in H.G.Reichenbach - Ethiopia
Roeperocharis bennettiana Rchb.f. - Ethiopia, Kenya, Tanzania, Malawi, Mozambique, Zambia 
Roeperocharis maleveziana Geerinck - Zaïre
Roeperocharis urbaniana Kraenzl. in H.G.Reichenbach - Ethiopia
Roeperocharis wentzeliana Kraenzl. - Zaïre, Tanzania, Malawi, Zambia

See also 
 List of Orchidaceae genera

References 

Orchids of Africa
Orchideae genera
Orchideae